The 2001 Sicilian regional election was held on 24 June 2001. For the first time the president of Region was elected directly by the citizens.

The election was competed by three competitors: Salvatore Cuffaro, House of Freedoms candidate; Leoluca Orlando, candidate of The Olive Tree and former mayor of Palermo; and Sergio D'Antoni, leader of European Democracy. Cuffaro won by a landslide.

Results

2001 elections in Italy
Elections in Sicily
June 2001 events in Europe